Mount Yengo is a mountain that is located in the Lower Hunter region of New South Wales, in eastern Australia.

Significance to indigenous Australians
Mount Yengo is a natural feature of spiritual and ceremonial importance to the Wonnarua, Awabakal, Worimi and Darkinjung Indigenous Australians. According to indigenous mythology, Mount Yengo is the place from which Baiame, a creational ancestral hero, jumped back up to the spirit world after he had created all of the mountains, lakes, rivers and caves in the area. Baiame flattened the top of Mount Yengo when he jumped skyward and the flat top is still visible today.

See also

List of mountains in New South Wales

References

Yengo
Great Dividing Range
Hunter Region
Australian Aboriginal mythology